Chris Janssens (born 12 June 1969 in Lier) is a retired Belgian football player and current football manager.

References

External links
 Profile & stats - Lokeren
 Career stats - Voetbal International
 
 

1969 births
Living people
Sportspeople from Genk
Footballers from Limburg (Belgium)
Belgian footballers
Belgium international footballers
Belgian expatriate footballers
Belgian Pro League players
Eredivisie players
K.S.C. Lokeren Oost-Vlaanderen players
Willem II (football club) players
K.V.C. Westerlo players
S.V. Zulte Waregem players
Lierse S.K. players
K. Sint-Niklase S.K.E. players
Expatriate footballers in the Netherlands
Belgian expatriate sportspeople in the Netherlands
Belgian football managers
Lierse S.K. managers
S.C. Eendracht Aalst managers
Association football defenders
21st-century Belgian politicians